In Greek mythology, Clymene or Klymene (Kluménē, feminine form of Κλύμενος, meaning "famous") is the name of one of the three thousand Oceanid nymphs, usually the wife of Iapetus and mother by him of Prometheus, Epimetheus, Atlas and Menoetius.

Mythology 
Clymene is the daughter of the Titans Oceanus and Tethys. She married her uncle Iapetus and became by him the mother of Prometheus, Epimetheus, Atlas and Menoetius. Other authors relate the same of her sister Asia. A less common genealogy makes Clymene the mother of Deucalion by Prometheus. She may also be the Clymene referred to as the mother of Mnemosyne by Zeus. In some myths, Clymene was one of the nymphs in the train of Cyrene.

Although she shares name and parentage with Clymene, one of Helios's lovers, who is also a daughter of Oceanus and Tethys (and thus one of her sisters and fellow Oceanid), she is distinguished from her.

Genealogy

See also 

 Electra
 Perse
 Pleione

Notes

Bibliography 
 Apollodorus, Gods & Heroes of the Greeks: The Library of Apollodorus, Michael Simpson (translator), The University of Massachusetts Press, (1976). .
Apollodorus, The Library with an English Translation by Sir James George Frazer, F.B.A., F.R.S. in 2 Volumes, Cambridge, MA, Harvard University Press; London, William Heinemann Ltd. 1921. ISBN 0-674-99135-4. Online version at the Perseus Digital Library. Greek text available from the same website.
 Hesiod, Theogony, in The Homeric Hymns and Homerica with an English Translation by Hugh G. Evelyn-White, Cambridge, MA., Harvard University Press; London, William Heinemann Ltd. 1914. Online version at the Perseus Digital Library.
 Hyginus, Gaius Julius, The Myths of Hyginus. Edited and translated by Mary A. Grant, Lawrence: University of Kansas Press, 1960.
 Gantz, Timothy, Early Greek Myth: A Guide to Literary and Artistic Sources, Johns Hopkins University Press, 1996, Two volumes:  (Vol. 1),  (Vol. 2).
 Hard, Robin, The Routledge Handbook of Greek Mythology: Based on H.J. Rose's "Handbook of Greek Mythology", Psychology Press, 2004, . Google Books.

External links 
 CLYMENE from The Theoi Project

Oceanids
Greek goddesses
Sea and river goddesses